Eastern Bloc is an artist-run centre based in Montreal, Quebec, Canada, dedicated to digital art. The centre was founded by Eliane Ellbogen and Sandor Poloskei in 2007. Its programming includes meeting with artists (Salon : Data), new media art laboratories, residencies, and the annual Sight and Sound festival.

Sight and Sound Festival

Sight and Sound is an international festival presenting digital art performances and installations as well as conferences on this subject. In line with the centre mandate, it gives an important place to emerging artists.

In 2015, the festival theme was HyperLocal. It included the work of Daniel Jolliffe.

In 2014, the festival was centred around the theme of black market and clandestineness, presenting artists such Nicolas Maigret, Steve Bates, Erin Sexton and Melissa F. Clarke.

In 2012, the festival was concerned with symmetrical systems.

Residencies
Eastern Bloc hosts artist residencies (for local and international artists). The program promulgates critical engagement, with a focus on DIY and open source culture as well as the political discourse surrounding contemporary digital culture.

Past artists in residence include:

2015-2016: 
Yolanda Duarte
Lucas Paris

2014-2015:
Sofian Audry, Samuel St-Aubin, Stephen Kelly
Santiago Leal
Audrey Samson

2013-2014:
Sahar Kubba
Erin Gee
Jordan Loeppky-Kolesnik
Jan Reimer and Max Stein

2012-2013:
Collectif Termostat
Fiona Annis
Tyson Parks
Kelly Jaclynn Andres

See also

 Canadian artist-run centres
 New Media art festivals

References

External links
  Official Website of Eastern Bloc

Artist-run centres
Art in Montreal